A gular fold is a feature of the body of lizards and many other reptiles. It is a granular fold found on the ventral throat, located immediately in front of the forelegs.

See also
 Gular (disambiguation), gular anatomical formations in other species

References

Vertebrate anatomy